Air Commerz was a German charter airline that operated for a short time between 1970 and 1972.

History

Air Commerz was set up in Hamburg in early 1970. The airline got the first of its two Vickers Viscounts from Aer Lingus in March and commenced operations in June 1970. The airline's official home base was Düsseldorf Airport although most flights were flown out of Hamburg Airport. The flights were all charter flights.

In March and May 1971 Air Commerz received two Boeing 707 from Pacific Western Airlines. The jets were introduced into service in June 1971 on a flight from Hamburg to Reims.

Due to financial problems the airline ceased operations in September 1972. Air Commerz was dissolved in January 1973.

Fleet
 2 Vickers 808 Viscount
 2 Boeing 707-138B

References

External links

Fleet reference

Defunct airlines of Germany
Airlines established in 1970
Airlines disestablished in 1972
1970 establishments in West Germany
1972 disestablishments in West Germany
German companies established in 1970